Poonthottam Mahan Nambudiri (also known as Poonthottam Damodaran Nambudiri) (1857-1946) was a poet from the Venmani School of Malayalam Literature.

He was the author of several Malayalam poems like Thaarakaasura Vadham,  Raajasooyam, Kuchelavritham, Guruvaayupura Maahaatmyam. His father was Poonthottam Achhan Nambudiri.

References 
http://namboothiri.com/articles/malayalam-literature.htm

1857 births
1946 deaths
Malayalam-language writers
19th-century Indian poets